Ran Danker (born Khalil Yosef Danker on January 7, 1984) is an Israeli–American actor, singer and model. He starred in hit Israeli series such as HaShir Shelanu (2004–2007),  The Gordin Cell (2012–2015),  Miguel (2018) and more. Danker received an Ophir Award nomination for Best Supporting Actor for his role in Eyes Wide Open (2009).  Danker was also nominated for an Ophir Award for Best Actor for his role in Doubtful (2017).

Early life
Danker was born in Norfolk, Virginia, United States, to a Jewish family. He is the son of Israeli actor Eli Danker. He went to Israel with his mother when he was two years old after his parents' divorce.  He grew up in the Bavli neighborhood in Tel Aviv. During that time he was a member of the Ha-Horesh tribe choir of the scouts youth movement. Towards his Junior High year, Ran and his mother moved to Poleg, Netanya. Between high school and his army service, Ran participated in a few TV commercials: a promo of Channel 10; a commercial of Bank Leumi; and the cell phone company Cellcom. As a teenager, Ran was a delivery boy for Domino's Pizza in Netanya. He was a helicopter technician during his military service in the Israel Defense Forces.

Career
As well as acting and singing, Danker is a fashion model in Israel and has appeared in campaigns for Diadora.

Film and television
In 2004 he landed a part in the hit musical TV series HaShir Shelanu (Our Song) that ran for four seasons. He was also in two children's shows, a musical production of The Sound of Music in Tel Aviv and later Haifa and the Festigal (an annual Hanukkah song festival) in 2004 and 2005. He has also appeared in the 2021 edition. In December 2005, Ran won the Gold Screen Award as the best actor, for his role in Our Song. In January 2006, he won the Kids Channel Award, for the same category. Danker also contributed his voice to the main character of Walt Disney's animated movie Chicken Little for Israel's Hebrew-dubbed version. Readers of the popular "Pnai Plus" TV digest awarded him actor of the year in 2006. In 2008 he began appearing as the titular character in the musical daily drama Danny Hollywood.

He plays, with the actor Zohar Strauss, the main role, as a gay lover, in the 2009 Israeli drama film Eyes Wide Open. Danker received an Ophir Award nomination as Best Supporting Actor for his role. Between 2012 and 2015, he appeared in the TV drama Gordin Cell playing the main character, Eyal "Alik" Gordin. Haaretz praised the show as "among the world's best suspense shows." It was also remade in the United States as Allegiance (2015). In 2017 he received an Ophir Award nomination for Best Actor for his role in Doubtful as a man that has to serve his community service by working with juvenile delinquents.

In 2018, Danker began appearing in the Hot TV series, Miguel. Danker plays a gay man who is determined to fulfil his dream of adopting a child. The series received its world premiere at the first ever Canneseries festival. Miguel won the special performance prize for best ensemble cast at Canneseries. In 2020 Danker stars in Honeymood, a new romantic comedy by Talya Lavie, director of Zero Motivation.

Stage
In The Sound of Music he played Rolf the Nazi postman who fell in love with Liesl, the oldest daughter of the von Trapp family. Ran performed in 40 shows until he left for Festigal 2005. In 2015 he played the German lawyer, Hans Litten in the Habima Theatre production of Taken at Midnight. Danker plays a lawyer who represented opponents of the Nazis at important political trials between 1929 and 1932, defending the rights of workers during the Weimar Republic. In 2017 he returned to Habima Theatre to play Che in the Israeli production of the hit musical, Evita.

Music
In 2007, Danker released his debut album, Shavim (Hebrew: שווים, "equal"), with guitarist Ilai Botner. Danker released a new Hebrew-language album, "Something Different" in 2018.

In March 2021, He released the hit song "Beit Meshugaim" (In Hebrew: "בית משוגעים"), that stayed the most stream Spotify song in Israel for 3.5 months in a row. On top of that, it stayed at the top of the Galgalatz chart for 8 weeks in a row, breaking the record for the most weeks in first place. This was followed in October 2021 by "Hasimla hadasha sheli" (in Hebrew: השמלה החדשה שלי meaning "My new dress") produced by DEGO.

Personal life
Danker was previously in a high-profile relationship with fellow HaShir Shelanu star, Ninet Tayeb. Israeli media labelled the pair "Raninet". Following the break up he was named the most eligible bachelor in 2007 by "Pnai Plus". He also reportedly dated his other HaShir Shelanu co-star, Ania Bukstein as well as the supermodel, Bar Refaeli. Danker and Refaeli's mothers are close friends. Danker and Tayeb remain friends and when asked in a 2019 Ynet interview about his former partner, Danker said that they will soon be in touch and will collaborate. The pair performed together in September 2019.

In July 2015, Danker came out as bisexual. He also stated that he has been in a relationship with a man for three years. In an interview Danker said "I simply fell in love, what's more surprising to me than being in a relationship with a man is that I’ve been in any relationship for three years. Period." He continued to say that "sexuality is another way for the soul to define itself, it's complicated and combines many components. The total of people is the total of sexual possibilities. I’m attracted to both women and men. Why should we narrow ourselves into a definition? I don't want to define myself."

He has been described as a "heart-throb", and as one of the most talked-about male stars in Israel.

Filmography

Discography

Albums
 Shavim (Hebrew: שווים, meaning "Equal") (2007) (joint with Elai Butner)
 Something Different (Hebrew: משהו אחר)  (2018)

Soundtrack
 Our Song (Hebrew: השיר שלנו) - Double album

Singles
"Shavim" (Hebrew: שווים) (2007)
 "Bo'i Nazov" (Hebrew: בואי נעזוב meaning Let's leave) (2007)
 "Ani Esh" (Hebrew: אני אש Meaning I am on fire) (2007) 
"Beit Meshugaim" (Hebrew: בית משוגעים) (2021)
"Hasimila Hadasha Shelly" (Hebrew: השמלה החדשה שלי) (2021)

References

External links
 

1984 births
Israeli male film actors
Israeli male models
21st-century Israeli male singers
Israeli pop singers
Israeli male television actors
Jewish male models
Jewish singers
Living people
People from Netanya
Musicians from Tel Aviv
Israeli people of Lithuanian-Jewish descent
Israeli people of Iraqi-Jewish descent
Israeli people of Turkish-Jewish descent
Bisexual male actors
Bisexual singers
Israeli LGBT actors
Bisexual Jews
LGBT models
Israeli bisexual people
Israeli LGBT singers
20th-century Israeli male actors
21st-century Israeli male actors
American emigrants to Israel